Henri Virlogeux (22 March 1924 – 19 December 1995) was a French actor. He is known for "The 400 Blows" (1959), "Les rois maudits" (1972) and "Schulmeister, espion de l'empereur" (1971). He was married to Véronique Silver. He died on December 19, 1995 in Paris, France.

Selected filmography

 The Seventh Commandment (1957) – Le garçon d'étage de province
 Let's Be Daring, Madame (1957) – Le cantonnier
  (1958) – Le portier de l'hôtel (uncredited)
 It's All Adam's Fault (1958)
 Le Septième Ciel (1958) – Le garçon de café
 School for Coquettes (1958) – Un employé du Racinet
  (1958) – Lapointe
 The 400 Blows (1959) – Night watchman
 Le secret du Chevalier d'Éon (1959) – Le roi de Prusse (uncredited)
  Lovers on a Tightrope (1960) – Le garçon d'étage
 Au coeur de la ville (1960)
 The Fenouillard Family (1960) – Le commandant 
  (1961) – Drummer
 A Man Named Rocca (1961) – Ficelle
  (1962) – Le commissaire (uncredited)
 Les sept péchés capitaux (1962) – Antonin (segment "Gourmandise, La") (uncredited)
 Arsène Lupin contre Arsène Lupin (1962) – L'inspecteur Ganimard (
 It's Not My Business (1962) – Pierjan 
 Vice and Virtue (1963) – L'intellectuel joueur d'échecs, président du tribunal
 Any Number Can Win (1963) – Mario
 The Day and the Hour (1963) – Legendre – le pharmacien résistant 
 Carom Shots (1963) – Brossard
  (1963) – Charquin
 Le Bon Roi Dagobert (1963) – L'instituteur
 Panic in Bangkok (1964) – Leasock
 Patate (1964) – Le professeur Bichard
 The Gorillas (1964) – Le second gardien à la Santé
 Henri-Georges Clouzot's Inferno (1964) – Dr. Arnoux
 The Sucker (1965) – Un complice de Saroyan
 Diamonds Are Brittle (1965) – Picard
  (1965) 
 Les Bons Vivants (1965) – Le médecin (segment "Fermeture, La") 
 The Mona Lisa Has Been Stolen (1966) – Le conservateur du Louvres
 Le Saint prend l'affût (1966) – Oscar Chartier
 Le Dimanche de la vie (1967) – M. Balustre
  (1967) – Savant
 Darling Caroline (1968) – Le docteur Guillotin
 A Strange Kind of Colonel (1968) – Le savant / Trilby Beach
 The Tattoo (1968) – Dubois, le percepteur
 The Madwoman of Chaillot (1969) – The Peddler
  (1969) – Doctor Binz
 Les femmes (1969) – La voix du maire (voice, uncredited)
  (1969) – Parizel père
 Tintin and the Temple of the Sun (1969) – Un des 7 savants (voice)
 Aladdin and His Magic Lamp (1970) – Le magicien d'Afrique (voice)
 Trop jolies pour être honnêtes (1972) – Gaëtan, le père de Bernadette
 Tintin and the Lake of Sharks (1972) – Le professeur Tournesol (voice)
 Les Rois maudits (1972) – Jacques Duèze/Pope John XXII (miniseries)
 The Twelve Tasks of Asterix (1976) – Panoramix / Iris (voice)
 L'Année sainte (1976) – Commissaire Barbier
  (1977) – Le deuxième gardien du Louvre
 Death of a Corrupt Man (1977) – Paul
  (1978) – Victor Brisquet
 La Ballade des Dalton (1978) – Tom O'Connor, le chercheur d'or (voice)
 The Associate (1979) – Urioste 
  (1980) – Le père de Pierre
 Cherchez l'erreur (1980) – Le directeur
 Signé Furax (1981) – Le passant égaré
 Les années lumière (1981) – Lawyer
 Flics de choc (1983) – Barraud, le chauffeur de taxi 
  (1985) – Le père d'Isabelle
  (1986) – Le vieux Gitan

External links
 

1924 births
1995 deaths
French male film actors
French male television actors
French male stage actors
French male video game actors
20th-century French male actors